H(+)/Cl(-) exchange transporter 4 is a protein that in humans is encoded by the CLCN4 gene.

Function 

The CLCN family of voltage-dependent chloride channel genes comprises nine members (CLCN1-7, Ka and Kb) which demonstrate quite diverse functional characteristics while sharing significant sequence homology. Chloride channel 4 has an evolutionary conserved CpG island and is conserved in both mouse and hamster. This gene is mapped in close proximity to APXL (Apical protein Xenopus laevis-like) and OA1 (Ocular albinism type I), which are both located on the human X chromosome at band p22.3. The physiological role of chloride channel 4 remains unknown but may contribute to the pathogenesis of neuronal disorders.

Clinical significance 

Mutations in this gene have been linked to cases of early onset epilepsy

See also 
 Chloride channel

References

Further reading

External links 
 
 

Ion channels